A , or simply , is a recessed space in a Japanese-style reception room, in which items for artistic appreciation are displayed. In English, a  could be called an alcove.

History
In the room of the monastery, there was a board called  which displayed Buddhist altar fittings such as candlesticks, incense burners and vases. On the wall behind  was a hanging scroll with a Buddhist theme.

In , an architectural style developed in the Muromachi period,  came to be used as room decoration, and the owner of the house sat in front of  decorated with various things to meet guests.

Characteristics
The  and its contents are essential elements of traditional Japanese interior decoration. The word  literally means "floor" or "bed";  means "space" or "room".
 
Stepping within it is strictly forbidden, except to change the display, when a strict etiquette must be followed.

It can range from a seemingly raw trunk with bark still attached, to a square piece of heart wood with very straight grain.

American architect Frank Lloyd Wright was influenced by Japanese architecture. He translated the meaning of the  into its Western counterpart: the fireplace. This gesture became more of a ceremonial core in his architecture.

See also
 Fireplace mantel
 Higashiyama culture in the Muromachi period

References

Further reading

External links
 

Japanese architectural features
Japanese home
Japanese words and phrases